In mathematics,  a Cartan subalgebra, often abbreviated as CSA, is a nilpotent subalgebra  of a Lie algebra  that is self-normalising (if  for all , then ). They were introduced by Élie Cartan in his doctoral thesis. It  controls the representation theory of a semi-simple Lie algebra  over a field of characteristic .

In a finite-dimensional semisimple Lie algebra over an algebraically closed field of characteristic zero (e.g.,  a Cartan subalgebra is the same thing as a maximal abelian subalgebra consisting of elements x such that the adjoint endomorphism  is semisimple (i.e., diagonalizable). Sometimes this characterization is simply taken as the definition of a Cartan subalgebra.pg 231

In general, a subalgebra is called toral if it consists of semisimple elements. Over an algebraically closed field, a toral subalgebra is automatically abelian. Thus, over an algebraically closed field of characteristic zero, a Cartan subalgebra can also be defined as a maximal toral subalgebra.

Kac–Moody algebras and generalized Kac–Moody algebras also have subalgebras that play the same role as the Cartan subalgebras of semisimple Lie algebras (over a field of characteristic zero).

Existence and uniqueness 
Cartan subalgebras exist for finite-dimensional Lie algebras whenever the base field is infinite. One way to construct a Cartan subalgebra is by means of a regular element. Over a finite field, the question of the existence is still open.

For a finite-dimensional semisimple Lie algebra  over an algebraically closed field of characteristic zero, there is a simpler approach: by definition, a toral subalgebra is a subalgebra of  that consists of semisimple elements (an element is semisimple if the adjoint endomorphism induced by it is diagonalizable).

In a finite-dimensional Lie algebra over an algebraically closed field of characteristic zero, all Cartan subalgebras are conjugate under automorphisms of the algebra, and in particular are all isomorphic. The common dimension of a Cartan subalgebra is then called the rank of the algebra.

For a finite-dimensional complex semisimple Lie algebra, the existence of a Cartan subalgebra is much simpler to establish, assuming the existence of a compact real form. In that case,  may be taken as the complexification of the Lie algebra of a maximal torus of the compact group.

If  is semisimple and the field has characteristic zero, then a maximal toral subalgebra is self-normalizing, and so is equal to the associated Cartan subalgebra.

Examples 

Any nilpotent Lie algebra is its own Cartan subalgebra.
A Cartan subalgebra of gln, the Lie algebra of n×n matrices over a field, is the algebra of all diagonal matrices.
For the special Lie algebra of traceless  matrices , it has the Cartan subalgebra  where  For example, in  the Cartan subalgebra is the subalgebra of matrices  with Lie bracket given by the matrix commutator.
The Lie algebra sl2(R) of 2 by 2 matrices of trace 0 has two non-conjugate Cartan subalgebras.
The dimension of a Cartan subalgebra is not in general the maximal dimension of an abelian subalgebra, even for complex simple Lie algebras. For example, the Lie algebra sl2n(C) of 2n by 2n matrices of trace 0 has a Cartan subalgebra of rank 2n−1 but has a maximal abelian subalgebra of dimension n2 consisting of all matrices of the form  with A any n by n matrix.  One can directly see this abelian subalgebra is not a Cartan subalgebra, since it is contained in the nilpotent algebra of strictly upper triangular matrices (or, since it is normalized by diagonal matrices).

Cartan subalgebras of semisimple Lie algebras 

For finite-dimensional semisimple Lie algebra  over an algebraically closed field of characteristic 0, a Cartan subalgebra  has the following properties:
 is abelian,
For the adjoint representation , the image  consists of semisimple operators (i.e., diagonalizable matrices).
(As noted earlier, a Cartan subalgebra can in fact be characterized as a subalgebra that is maximal among those having the above two properties.)

where 
.

Let . The above decomposition can then be written as:

As it turns out, for each ,  has dimension one and so:
.

See also Semisimple_Lie algebra#Structure for further information.

Decomposing representations with dual Cartan subalgebra 
Given a Lie algebra  over a field of characteristic  and a Lie algebra representation there is a decomposition related to the decomposition of the Lie algebra from its Cartan subalgebra. If we set

Classification of irreducible representations using weights 

But, it turns out these weights can be used to classify the irreducible representations of the Lie algebra . Moreover, given a  such that  for every positive root  there exists a unique irreducible representation  This means the root system  contains all information about the representation theory of

Splitting Cartan subalgebra 

Over non-algebraically closed fields, not all Cartan subalgebras are conjugate. An important class are splitting Cartan subalgebras: if a Lie algebra admits a splitting Cartan subalgebra  then it is called splittable, and the pair  is called a split Lie algebra; over an algebraically closed field every semisimple Lie algebra is splittable. Any two splitting Cartan algebras are conjugate, and they fulfill a similar function to Cartan algebras in semisimple Lie algebras over algebraically closed fields, so split semisimple Lie algebras (indeed, split reductive Lie algebras) share many properties with semisimple Lie algebras over algebraically closed fields.

Over a non-algebraically closed field not every semisimple Lie algebra is splittable, however.

Cartan subgroup 

A Cartan subgroup of a Lie group is one of the subgroups whose Lie algebra is a Cartan subalgebra. The identity component of a subgroup has the same Lie algebra. There is no standard convention for which one of the subgroups with this property is called the Cartan subgroup, especially in the case of disconnected groups. A Cartan subgroup of a compact connected Lie group is a maximal connected Abelian subgroup (a maximal torus). Its Lie algebra is a Cartan subalgebra.

For disconnected compact Lie groups there are several inequivalent definitions of a Cartan subgroup. The most common seems to be the one given by David Vogan, who defines a Cartan subgroup to be the group of elements that normalize a fixed maximal torus and fix the fundamental Weyl chamber. This is sometimes called the large Cartan subgroup. There is also a small Cartan subgroup, defined to be the centralizer of a maximal torus. These Cartan subgroups need not be abelian in general.

Examples of Cartan Subgroups
 The subgroup in GL2(R) consisting of diagonal matrices.

References

Notes 

 Lie algebras and their Representations
 Infinite-dimensional Lie algebras

Reference 

 

Lie algebras